The Twelve Pillars to Peace and Prosperity Party (TP4) is a political party in Solomon Islands. Launched on 30 May 2010 by Delma Nori, it is the first "women's party" in the country's history. Its stated aim is "to provide a channel for mobilization of women and men who believe in a democratic process that is gender friendly". It took part in the 2010 general election, seeking to have women elected to a Parliament which, in its outgoing legislature, contained no female representatives. It also calls for a more equitable share of the country's resources.

Its membership is not restricted to women.

References

Political parties in the Solomon Islands
Political parties established in 2010
Feminist parties
Feminist organisations in the Solomon Islands
2010 establishments in the Solomon Islands